The 1969 Israel Super Cup was the sixth Israel Super Cup, an annual Israeli football match played between the winners of the previous season's Top Division and Israel State Cup, and the first time the competition was played under the IFA.

The match was played between Hapoel Tel Aviv, champions of the 1968–69 Liga Leumit and Hakoah Ramat Gan, winners of the 1968–69 Israel State Cup. At the match, played at Bloomfield Stadium, Hapoel Tel Aviv won 5–1.

Match details

References

1969
Super Cup
Super Cup 1969
Super Cup 1969
Israel Super Cup matches